Ed "Vet" Barnes, also listed as Sam Barnes, was a professional baseball pitcher in the Negro leagues. He played with the Kansas City Monarchs in 1937 and 1938.

References

External links
 and Seamheads 

Kansas City Monarchs players
Year of birth missing
Year of death missing
Baseball pitchers